David Atkins (born 1955) is an Australian dancer, choreographer, music-theatre director and producer.

David Atkins may also refer to:
David Atkins (actor), British Hollyoaks actor
David Atkins (businessman) (born 1966), British businessman
David Atkins (Royal Navy officer) (died 1811)

Dave Atkins may refer to:
Dave Atkins (actor) (1940–2008), English actor
Dave Atkins (American football) (born 1949), coach and running back
Dave Atkins (musician), Australian hip hop artist with Resin Dogs